This is a list of schools in the Roman Catholic Archdiocese of Miami.

High schools

Directly operated by the archdiocese :

Sponsored by the archdiocese:

Grade schools

Broward County

 Northeast
 Mary Help of Christians (Parkland)
 St. Ambrose (Deerfield Beach)
 St. Andrew (Coral Springs)
 St. Anthony (Fort Lauderdale)
 St. Coleman (Pompano Beach)
 St. Jerome (Fort Lauderdale)
 Northwest
 All Saints (Sunrise)
 Our Lady Queen of Martyrs (Fort Lauderdale)
 St. Bonaventure (Davie)
 St. David (Davie)
 St. Gregory (Plantation)
 St. Helen (Lauderdale Lakes - Fort Lauderdale postal address)
 South
 Annunciation (West Park) - It is in West Park, though its address is sometimes stated as being in West Hollywood
 Little Flower (Hollywood)
 Nativity (Hollywood)
 St. Bartholomew (Miramar)
 St. Bernadette (Davie - Hollywood postal address)
 St. Mark (Southwest Ranches)

Miami-Dade County
 East
 St. Agnes (Key Biscayne)
 St. Hugh (Coconut Grove, Miami)
 St. Michael the Archangel (Miami)
 St. Patrick (Miami Beach)
 Sts. Peter and Paul (Miami)
 Northeast
 Holy Family (North Miami)
 St. James (North Miami)
 St. Lawrence (Ojus, unincorporated area - North Miami Beach address)
 St. Mary Cathedral (Miami)
 St. Rose of Lima (Miami Shores)
 Northwest
 Blessed Trinity (Virginia Gardens, near Miami Springs)
 Immaculate Conception (Hialeah)
 Mother of Our Redeemer (unincorporated area, Miami, or Hialeah address)
 Our Lady of the Lakes (Miami Lakes) - It opened in 1986.
 St. John the Apostle (Hialeah)
 South
 Mother of Christ (Unincorporated area, Miami address)
 Our Lady of Lourdes Parish School (The Hammocks, Unincorporated area, Miami address) - Established in 1997.
 Our Lady of the Holy Rosary-St. Richard (Cutler Bay, address is sometimes stated as a Miami address) - Previously known as Our Lady of the Holy Rosary, previously in Cutler Ridge CDP (Perrine address).
 St. John Neumann (Kendall, Unincorporated area, Miami address) - Established in 1981.
 St. Louis Covenant (Pinecrest)
 Southeast
 Epiphany (Ponce-Davis, Unincorporated area, Miami address)
 St. Theresa (Coral Gables)
 St. Thomas the Apostle (Glenvar Heights, Unincorporated area, Miami address)
 St. Timothy (Westwood Lakes, Unincorporated area, Miami address)
 West
 Good Shepherd (Kendale Lakes, unincorporated area, Miami address)
 St. Agatha (University Park, Unincorporated area, Miami address)
 St. Brendan (Westchester, Unincorporated area, Miami address)
 St. Kevin (Tamiami, unincorporated area, Miami address) - Opened in August 1980.
 Immaculate Conception (Hialeah)

Monroe County
 Basilica School of St. Mary Star of the Sea (Key West)

Special education
 Marian Center School and Services (Miami Gardens)

Defunct schools
In 2009 the archdiocese closed six schools, which had a combined total of 889 students.

 Closed
Archbishop Curley-Notre Dame High School, Miami
Holy Cross Academy (Florida) (independent)
 Grade schools
Corpus Christi (Miami) - Closed in 2009
Our Lady of Divine Providence (Fontainebleau CDP, unincorporated area, Miami address) - In proximity to Sweetwater, closed in 2009
Sacred Heart (Homestead) - Closed in 2009
Saint Clement (Wilton Manors, Fort Lauderdale address) - Opened in the 1950s and closed in 2009. According to Akilah Johnson of the South Florida Sun Sentinel, area parents indicated that St. Ambrose and St. Jerome's Catholic School would take most of the students who could not go to Saint Clement anymore.
Saint Elizabeth of Hungary (Pompano Beach) - The church attempted to resolve its debt to the archdiocese by loaning $2.13 million from Bank of America, and the school had $337,000 in debt in 2009, and it ballooned to $1.3 million of debt in the 2009–2010 school year. It closed on June 15, 2010.
Saint Francis Xavier (Miami) - Closed in 2009
Saint Joseph (Miami Beach)
Saint Justin Martyr, Academy of Marine Science (PK-9) (Key Largo)
Saint Malachy School (Tamarac)
Saint Monica School (Carol City CDP, later in Miami Gardens)
Saint Stephen Catholic School (Miramar) - Opened in the 1950s and closed in 2009, with the building rented to a charter school.

References

External links
Schools of the Miami Archdiocese
Catholic Schools Directory 
 

Miami

Miami, Roman Catholic Diocese of
Education in Miami
Miami-related lists